Nancy Pelosi is a prominent American politician who has been Speaker of the United States House of Representatives twice, from 2007 to 2011 and from 2019 to 2023. She was the first woman to serve as Speaker and is considered one of the most consequential House Speakers in American history. During her career, she has received multiple awards and honors in the US and from around the world.

Foreign honors 

  -  Knight Grand Cross of the Order of Merit of the Italian Republic on June 2, 2007 (Officer on June 2, 2001).
  -  Grand Cordon of the Order of the Rising Sun on April 29, 2015.
  -  Grand Cross of the Order of the Golden Heart on June 23, 2008.
  -  Special Grand Cordon of the Order of Propitious Clouds on August 3, 2022.
  -  Member 3rd Class of the Order of Princess Olga on April 30, 2022.
  -  Member 2nd Class of the Order of Prince Yaroslav the Wise on October 21, 2022.

Academic honors

Awards and Honors 

 2006: Barbara Walters's Most Fascinating Person of the year.
2006: Golden Plate Award of the American Academy of Achievement.
 2007  Glamour Woman of the Year Award
 2007  TIME 100 Most Influential People 
 2007  National Equality Award, for leading the fight for LGBT rights  
 2008  TIME 100 Most Influential People
 2009 TIME Person of the Year Runner Up, TIME 100 Most Influential People
 2010 TIME 100 Most Influential People
 2010: 11th on the Forbes list of the world's 100 most powerful women
 2013: Induction into the National Women's Hall of Fame.
 2014: 26th on the Forbes list of the world's 100 most powerful women
 2016: Foremother Award from the National Center for Health Research
 2016  Hubert H. Humphrey Civil and Human Rights Award
 2018  TIME 100 Most Influential People
 2019  JFK Profile in Courage Award
 2019: 3rd on the Forbes list of the world's 100 most powerful women
 2019: Honoree at the VH1 Trailblazer Honors.
 2019 LBJ Liberty & Justice for All Award
 2019 Robert F Kennedy Ripple of Hope Award
 2019 TIME 100 Most Influential People 
 2020 TIME 100 Most Influential People
 2020 TIME 100 Women of the Year, TIME's list of 100 most influential women over the past century
 2020 7th on Forbes World's Most Powerful Women List
 2020 Madeleine K. Albright Democracy Award
 2021: Inaugural Forbes 50 Over 50, a list of notable entrepreneurs, leaders, scientists and creators over age 50.
 2021 Inaugural Women for Peace and Security Prize, an honor awarded by the NATO Parliamentary Assembly
 2022 25th on Forbes World's Most Powerful Women List

References 

Awards
Lists of awards received by person